Bêtises de Cambrai are a French boiled sweet made in the town of Cambrai. "" is French for "nonsense" or "stupid mistake" and the sweets are said to have been invented by accident. Two confectioners claim to be the original inventors: Afchain and Despinoy. The original flavour is mint, but many others are now produced. Stripes of caramel (made from sugar and glucose syrup) are added to sweeten the taste of the mint. 

The original (metal) boxes sold by Afchain were emblazoned with the slogan "" ("Get a taste of this") along with "" ("Afchain sole inventor").

See also
Humbug (sweet)

References

French confectionery
French cuisine
Candy
Cambrai